The Unsuspected is a 1947 American mystery film noir directed by Michael Curtiz and starring Claude Rains, Audrey Totter, Ted North, Constance Bennett, Joan Caulfield, and Hurd Hatfield. The film was based on a novel by Charlotte Armstrong. The screenplay was co-written by Bess Meredyth, who was married to director Curtiz.

Plot
In Victor Grandison's suburban New York home, a shadowy figure murders his secretary, Roslyn Wright. He leaves her body hanging from a chandelier. It is reported as suicide. Cut to the studio a week later, where Grandison, who hosts a popular "true crime" radio show called The Unsuspected, is broadcasting.

At his home his niece Althea is throwing a surprise birthday party for him. She hopes it will take his mind off the combined loss of his secretary and his wealthy ward, Matilda, who reportedly perished in a sinking en route to Portugal some weeks earlier.

Oliver, Althea's husband, is drinking heavily. He and Matilda were engaged before Althea married him.  Althea is shocked by the arrival of a mysterious Steven Howard, who claims to be married to Matilda.

After the broadcast Victor returns home, and is underwhelmed by events there. Homicide Detective Donovan stays after the party to share a thick file on a hatchet-murder case with Victor and witnesses Victor's first meeting with Steven. With Matilda's multi-million-dollar estate to be settled, Victor asks Donovan to investigate. Meanwhile, in Rio de Janeiro, Matilda boards a Pan American plane.

Victor is dictating a script (to a phonograph record). His producer, Jane Moynihan, asks what's wrong; he seems to have lost his zip. He responds that he has had a premonition. Donovan reports back that Steven checks out, and indeed is very rich. A cable arrives. Althea is making a play for Steven when Victor delivers the news that Matilda is alive and well and arriving the next day.

Press, a killer whose identity Victor uncovered but kept secret, tries to kill him but is thwarted when Victor plays a copy of the confession he recorded at the time. Victor  threatens that the police will hear it if he is killed. Press then becomes Victor's henchman.

Steven meets Matilda at the airport. She claims to have no memory of him or their marriage, despite compelling evidence unfolded for her. The next day, Steve takes the early train to town; Victor searches and finds a picture of Roslyn in Steve's wallet. In the city, Jane meets Steve. They have been working together to prove that Roslyn was murdered. Steve goes to Donovan, who takes him to Victor's to investigate and show Victor their new evidence that it was murder.

Althea, who had been on the phone with Roslyn at the time of the murder and concealed it from police, already suspects the extravagant Victor. She kept quiet because she, too, depends on Matilda's money. 

Victor records a quarrel between Althea and Oliver and kindly encourages Oliver to leave. He confesses to Althea that he killed Roslyn because she had discovered his misuse of Matilda's estate. Then he shoots Althea dead. With Matilda and Steven as witnesses, Victor uses the recordings to frame Oliver and sets the police on him. The alcohol-impaired Oliver dies in a car crash when the brakes Victor had sabotaged fail.

Jane brings Steve and Matilda together. He explains that he had known Roslyn all his life, and expected to marry her, but for being called away to war. Matilda dismisses his warnings about Victor.

Victor prepares to kill Matilda, pretending to need her help writing down lines for his radio show. The dramatic lines, now written in longhand by her, are actually text that he can use as her suicide note. He summons Press. Steven finds the recording that Victor used to frame Oliver and calls Donovan to tell him, but hangs up when Victor opens the door after leaving a brief coded message. Victor destroys the record. Press knocks Steve out and stuffs him into a trunk, then careens away in his pickup to dispose of it.

Victor gives Matilda drugged wine. She regains consciousness, sees the note and the open bottle of pills Victor has strewn over it, but cannot make it past the door. Donovan and others arrive, thanks to the interrupted call from Steve, and revive her. They track Press to the yard of a trash incinerator where he has dumped the trunk, which is perilously close to being dumped into the fire pit. Donovan stops the incinerator employee just before the trunk is destroyed.

Victor introduces his broadcast as usual but is thrown off when Donovan enters the control booth and police surround the auditorium. Matilda and a badly bruised Steven are ushered into the audience. Victor confesses to the murders on air, ending with: "I am The Unsuspected, your genial host, Victor Grandison."

The last scene is a long shot of Victor and two policemen, silhouetted against moonlit pavement, walking toward the yawning gates of a prison.

Cast 

 Joan Caulfield as Matilda Frazier, Grandison's ward
 Claude Rains as Victor Grandison
 Audrey Totter as Althea Keane, Grandison's niece
 Constance Bennett as Jane Moynihan
 Hurd Hatfield as Oliver Keane
 Ted North as Steven Howard (billed as Michael North)
 Fred Clark as Police Detective Richard Donovan
 Harry Lewis as Max
 Jack Lambert as Press
 Nana Bryant as Mrs. White
 Walter Baldwin as Judge Maynard
 Ray Walker as Donovan's Assistant
 Barbara Woodell (uncredited) as Roslyn Wright

Production
The Unsuspected was originally a serial in The Saturday Evening Post, running from August 11 to September 29, 1945. It was subsequently published as a novel in January 1946. Warner Bros purchased the film rights prior to publication, and in May 1946, they announced that Michael Curtiz would direct. Ranald MacDougall wrote the first screenplay. By then, Warner Bros had just signed a 14-picture contract with Michael Curtiz's production company, and The Unsuspected was the first of three movies under the new arrangement. Curtiz's wife, Bess Meredyth, who was on the board of the company, was brought in to collaborate on the script. Charles Hoffman was assigned the job of producer.

Casting 
In September 1945, Robert Alda was reported to be the film's star. In October 1946, it was reported that Humphrey Bogart was being "pencilled in to head the cast". A column that appeared on October 23, 1946, noted that Claude Rains was being sought instead of Bogart, suggesting that Bogart was originally being considered for the role of the villain, although the items are too brief to be certain of this, and he may have intended for the hero part.

Eventually, Dana Andrews was set to star as part of a package deal including Virginia Mayo and Cathy O'Donnell. All three were under contract to Sam Goldwyn, who was lending them to Curtiz for $150,000 plus 15% of the profits. Claude Rains reported to work on December 26, 1947. Two weeks later, Andrews left the production after being dissatisfied with the size of his part in comparison to Rains' in which Curtiz refused to make changes. Michael North was hired to replace Andrews. North was given an "introducing..." credit, although he had been appearing in films for years.

Curtiz had only agreed to take Mayo and O'Donnell in order to get Andrews, so his departure meant recasting their roles. On January 4, 1947, The New York Times announced that Joan Caulfield was being borrowed from Paramount to play Matilda, the role intended for Mayo. On January 15, 1947, The New York Times reported that Curtiz had signed Constance Bennett and Donald Crisp for "two major supporting roles". Crisp ultimately did not appear in the film. To fill the role intended for Cathy O'Donnell, Audrey Totter was borrowed from Metro-Goldwyn-Mayer.

Eve Arden was named for a "leading role" in November 1946, but was not in the cast.

Reception

Critical response
The New York Times film critic Bosley Crowther wrote: "There is reasonable ground for suspicion that the people who made The Unsuspected thought that they were fashioning another Laura, popular mystery of a few years back... But, beyond a brisk flurry of excitement and wickedness at the start, it bears little showmanly resemblance to that previous top-drawer effort in this line... (T)he yarn gets away temptingly. Once launched, however, it starts leaking, pulling apart at the seams, and generally foundering in a welter of obvious contrivances and clichés... Claude Rains is intriguing as the fashionable radio ghoul and Michael North, a new young actor, looks good as the lad who 'breaks' the case. However, the rest of the performers... are as patly artificial as the plot."

Film historians Alain Silver and Elizabeth Ward write that the film is impressive because of its emphasis on style: "Jack Lambert as the blackmailed killer lies in bed smoking. The radio is on and Alexander Grandison is detailing the story of his particular crime. The only source of the illumination in this dingy hotel room comes from a partially obscured flashing neon sign. The letters that are visible through the window seem to echo the thoughts of the uncomfortable murderer as it keeps blinking "KILL...KILL...KILL."

References

External links
 
 
 
 

1947 films
1947 crime films
1947 mystery films
American black-and-white films
American crime films
American mystery films
Film noir
Films scored by Franz Waxman
Films about radio people
Films based on American novels
Films based on works by Charlotte Armstrong
Films directed by Michael Curtiz
Films with screenplays by Bess Meredyth
Films with screenplays by Ranald MacDougall
Warner Bros. films
1940s English-language films
1940s American films